The Kenya national cricket team toured South Africa from 31 October to 2 November 2008. They played two One Day Internationals against South Africa.

ODI series

1st ODI

2nd ODI

References

External links
 Series home at ESPN Cricinfo

2008 in South African cricket
2008–09 South African cricket season
International cricket competitions in 2008–09
2008-09